The Diocese of La Ceiba is a Latin Church ecclesiastical jurisdiction or diocese of the Catholic Church in Honduras. It is a suffragan in the ecclesiastical province of the metropolitan Archdiocese of San Pedro Sula. The diocese was erected on 30 December 2011 by Pope Benedict XVI.

History
Erected 30 December 2011 as a suffragan see of Tegucigalpa
Transferred 26 January 2023 to the newly created metropolitan province of San Pedro Sula

Bishops 
 Michael Lenihan, OFM (30 December 2011 – 26 January 2023), made the first archbishop of San Pedro Sula

See also
Catholic Church in Honduras

References

La Ceiba
La Ceiba
La Ceiba
La Ceiba
Roman Catholic Ecclesiastical Province of Tegucigalpa